The canton of Lunel is an administrative division of the Hérault department, southern France. Its borders were modified at the French canton reorganisation which came into effect in March 2015. Its seat is in Lunel.

Composition 

It consists of the following communes:

Boisseron
Campagne
Entre-Vignes
Galargues
Garrigues
Lunel
Lunel-Viel
Marsillargues
Saint-Just
Saint-Nazaire-de-Pézan
Saint-Sériès
Saturargues
Saussines
Villetelle

Councillors

Pictures of the canton

References 

Cantons of Hérault